Enablers are originally a post-punk band formed in San Francisco, California which features the poetry/spoken word of Pete Simonelli. The current members now mostly exist on opposite sides of the American coasts.

History
In addition to Simonelli, a published poet and writer who was working as a courier in the band's early years, the band's lineup includes Joe Goldring (guitar, formerly of Swans, Toiling Midgets and [concurrent with Enablers] Touched by a Janitor), Kevin Thomson (guitar, Timco, Nice Strong Arm, Morning Champ, and [also concurrent with Enablers] Touched by a Janitor), and Yuma Joe Byrnes (drums, ex-Tarnation / Broken Horse, Touched by a Janitor).

Enablers' first album, End Note, was released on Neurot Recordings in 2004. In 2006 they released their second LP Output Negative Space,  (described by PopMatters as having "a swagger that seems almost malevolent",) and a split single with the band Redpanda. 

In 2007 they released the single-sided one track twelve-inch single "The Achievement" through Lancashire and Somerset, which also appeared in abbreviated form on the follow up album, Tundra,  in 2008, a shared release between Lancashire and Somerset, Majic Wallet, and Exile on Mainstream. In 2009 the band released Now You Can Answer My Prayers as a 10" vinyl-only EP, again through Lancashire and Somerset.

After a short hiatus, following the departure of Joe Byrnes, Doug Scharin (formerly of Codeine, HiM, June of 44, Rex, and Mice Parade) joined the band as drummer for the recording of the album Blown Realms And Stalled Explosions (released in 2011) and for subsequent tours.

As of 2013 the band has toured and recorded with a new drummer, Sam Ospovat (Beep, Naytronix, Timosaurus, Anteater, Passwords, CavityFang, Kapowski and PIKI). Enablers' 2015 album, The Rightful Pivot, was released on the Atypeek Music, Lancashire and Somerset, and Exile on Mainstream labels, and was supported by European tours. Sam has remained as a drummer and composer through Enablers' last two releases, Zones (2019-- Lancashire and Somerset/Exile on Mainstream/Broken Clover) and Pigeon Diaries (2020-- Lancashire and Somerset/Exile on Mainstream/Broken Clover).

Musical style
INDY METAL VAULT July 2019: “Enablers have a sound all their own, though. The fluttering interplay between guitarists Joe Goldring and Kevin Thomson and the tight but emotive drumming of Sam Ospovat provide a backdrop for Pete Simonelli’s sharp tongue that ebbs dissonantly and flows serenely along with his lyrical slice-of-life tales.”

GHOST CULT July 2019: “Most people’s experience of ‘spoken word’ music, outside of the Rap genre, is Jim Morrison‘s ‘American Prayer’. Beat Poetry, for this is essentially the format, is a hugely involving yet highly personal style which often resounds with the listener. This is most definitely the case with Enablers: a San Francisco post-Punk four-piece whose beguiling, occasionally fiery music is set to the poetry and narrative of frontman Pete Simonelli. […] a compelling listen from beginning to end and a supreme example of an immediate, magnetic form of expression.”

SOUNDBLAB July 2019: “Enablers function as a true guitar-driven post-rock band, anywhere on the line between Slint and Godspeed! You Black Emperor, making that link between spoken word and music an even more complex thing to achieve. And yes, they do achieve it!”

From Jack Chuter’s Storm Static Sleep – A Pathway Through Post-Rock:(Enablers’) music lands between the slippery harmonic surfaces of early 90s post-rock and the softened elegance of the more modern incarnations of it, the guitars dragged like a ribbon by the elusive poetic imagery of Pete Simonelli’s spoken word.

From Jordan Mamone, writing for Noisey: Enablers’ snaking guitar telepathy is equally distinctive…Joe Goldring and Kevin Thomson (have) refined an intuitive vocabulary of filigreed arpeggios, needling leads, and grand crescendos that roil like the vast Pacific….Simonelli has accomplished that rarest of feats: enhancing slow-burning, noir-ish rock with unapologetic poetry that actually flatters rather than overshadows the songs…(Ospovat’s) improvisational arsenal of rolls, taps, and flutters allows for spontaneity without sacrificing impact.

DROWNED IN SOUND – 8/10 review (April 2015): It has long been a treasured fact, for those in the know, that Enablers are one of the finest underground rock bands in the world…Not only is it a very fine record – almost indisputably the group’s best to date – but it also acts as an expert guide to the multi-faceted Enablers sound. Simonelli is always reliable, a storyteller who has managed to adopt beat stylings without alienating listeners whose literary interests reside elsewhere entirely….Enablers have grafted their way towards a post-punk approach that enables them to accentuate their core attributes whilst simultaneously articulating clearer than ever the restless energy that has always been at the heart of their music.

THE SKINNY – 5/5 review (April 2015): Mirroring his performance-poet mastery of cadence and timing, Enablers’ well-travelled musicians whip up a storm of post-rock dynamics that emphasise his undertones with power and dexterity, often adding up to majesty….The best is saved ‘til last, however – Enopolis’ layered textures underwrite a spirited percussive chaos, stabbing and slashing at fractured bleakness to create something uniqely resonant. Both gut-rupturingly visceral and cerebrally complex, Enablers are a remarkable band.

SOUNDBLAB – review (April 2015): There’s a steadily building momentum as guitars cascade and vocalist Pete Simonelli intones, shouts and passionately dispenses his ever capable lyricism. It’s a world inhabited by troubled streets, police cars, wet matches and empty cans; the capacity for violence hanging in the air but with glimpses of something beautiful lingering under the darkness.

ECHOES AND DUST – review (March 2015): With a more sparse approach more than ever Enablers live or die by the quality of singer/narrator Pete Simonelli’s writing. Thankfully he’s an impressive wordsmith, portraying a cast of no hopers and down and outers living their lives less than well with a novelist’s ear for detail… If you’ve ever craved a band that did what Slint did on those Spiderland tracks and took it in weird and wonderful narrative directions you’ll probably already be aware of Enablers. And if not you might just have found your new favourite band.

Discography

Albums
End Note (2004), Neurot
Output Negative Space (2006), Neurot
Tundra (2008), Atypeek Music, Lancashire and Somerset/Majic Wallet/Exile on Mainstream
Blown Realms And Stalled Explosions (2011), Atypeek Music, Exile On Mainstream, Lancashire and Somerset
 Berlinesque (2014), Digital Release/Bandcamp
The Rightful Pivot (2015), Atypeek Music, Lancashire and Somerset, Exile on Mainstream
Zones (2019), Broken Clover Records, Lancashire and Somerset, Exile on Mainstream
Pigeon Diaries (2020), Broken Clover Records, Lancashire and Somerset, Exile on Mainstream

Singles, EPs
Split with Redpanda (2007), Lancashire and Somerset
"The Achievement" (2007), Awesome Vistas
"Now You Can Answer My Prayers" (2009), Lancashire and Somerset
"Berlinesque" (2014), Online Release/Bandcamp
"The Percentages" (2014)

References

External links 
 Official Facebook page
 Official Bandcamp page
 

Indie rock musical groups from California
Musical groups from San Francisco